Hydrodynamic escape refers to a thermal atmospheric escape mechanism that can lead to the escape of heavier atoms of a planetary atmosphere through numerous collisions with lighter atoms.

Description 
Hydrodynamic escape occurs if there is a strong thermally driven atmospheric escape of light atoms which, through drag effects (collisions), also drive off heavier atoms. The heaviest species of atom that can be removed in this manner is called the cross-over mass.

In order to maintain a significant hydrodynamic escape, a large source of energy at a certain altitude is required.  Soft X-ray or extreme ultraviolet radiation, momentum transfer from impacting meteoroids or asteroids, or the heat input from planetary accretion processes may provide the requisite energy for hydrodynamic escape.

Calculations 
Estimating the rate of hydrodynamic escape is important in analyzing both the history and current state of a planet's atmosphere. In 1981, Watson et al. published calculations that describe energy-limited escape, where all incoming energy is balanced by escape to space. Recent numerical simulations on exoplanets have suggested that this calculation overestimates the hydrodynamic flux by 20 - 100 times.[30] However, as a special case and upper limit approximation on the atmospheric escape, it is worth noting here.

Hydrodynamic escape flux ([ms]) in an energy-limited escape can be calculated, assuming (1) an atmosphere composed of non-viscous, (2) constant molecular weight gas, with (3) isotropic pressure, (4) fixed temperature, (5) perfect XUV absorption, and that (6) pressure decreases to zero as distance from the planet increases.

Corrections to this model have been proposed over the years to account for the Roche lobe of a planet and efficiency in absorbing photon flux.

However, as computational power has improved, increasingly sophisticated models have emerged, incorporating radiative transfer, photochemistry, and hydrodynamics that provide better estimates of hydrodynamic escape.

Isotope fractionation as evidence 
The root mean square thermal velocity of an atomic species is

where  is the Boltzmann constant, is the temperature, and is the mass of the species. Lighter molecules or atoms will therefore be moving faster than heavier molecules or atoms at the same temperature. This is why atomic hydrogen escapes preferentially from an atmosphere and also explains why the ratio of lighter to heavier isotopes of atmospheric particles can indicate hydrodynamic escape.

Specifically, the ratio of different noble gas isotopes  (20Ne/22Ne, 36Ar/38Ar, 78,80,82,83,86Kr/84Kr, 124,126,128,129,131,132,134,136Xe/130Xe) or hydrogen isotopes (D/H) can be compared to solar levels to indicate likelihood of hydrodynamic escape in the atmospheric evolution. Ratios larger or smaller than compared with that in the sun or CI chondrites, which are used as proxy for the sun, indicate that significant hydrodynamic escape has occurred since the formation of the planet. Since lighter atoms preferentially escape, we expect smaller ratios for the noble gas isotopes (or a larger D/H) correspond to a greater likelihood of hydrodynamic escape, as indicated in the table.

Matching these ratios can also be used to validate or verify computational models seeking to describe atmospheric evolution. This method has also been used to determine the escape of oxygen relative to hydrogen in early atmospheres.

Examples 
Exoplanets that are extremely close to their parent star, such as hot Jupiters can experience significant hydrodynamic escape to the point where the star "burns off" their atmosphere upon which they cease to be gas giants and are left with just the core, at which point they would be called Chthonian planets. Hydrodynamic escape has been observed for exoplanets close to their host star, including the hot Jupiters HD 209458b.

Within a stellar lifetime, the solar flux may change. Younger stars produce more EUV, and the early protoatmospheres of Earth, Mars, and Venus likely underwent hydrodynamic escape, which accounts for the noble gas isotope fractionation present in their atmospheres.

References

Atmosphere